Kikin may refer to:

 Kikin Hall, the residence of Alexander Kikin
 Kikin, Iran, a village in Kurdistan Province, Iran
 Kikin Hall, one of the oldest buildings in Saint Petersburg, Russia
 Kikin (surname)